The Insects is a peer-reviewed open access scientific journal of entomology published monthly by MDPI since 2010. The editor-in-chief is Brian T. Forschler from (University of Georgia). The journal is affiliated with the American Association of Professional Apiculturists. According to the 2021 edition of the Journal Citation Reports, the journal has a 2020 impact factor of 2.769, ranking 18th out of 102 in 'Entomology'. CiteScore 2020 (Scopus): 2.3, which equals rank 59/153 in 'Insect Science'.

Abstracting and indexing
The journal is abstracted and indexed in:

Awards
The journal organize the "Young Investigator Award" for 2018, aiming to promote the work of young scientists by publishing their work free of charge.

References

External links 
 

Open access journals
MDPI academic journals
Monthly journals
English-language journals
Entomology